Language is the debut studio album by British singer-songwriter and record producer MNEK. It was released on 7 September 2018 through Virgin EMI Records and became his second solo project, succeeding his debut extended play Small Talk, released in 2015. Singles from Language include "Tongue", "Colour", "Correct" and "Girlfriend". The album's release was followed by a UK tour in 2018 and an American leg in 2019.

Language was received well by critics, with NME awarded Language four stars, as did The Line of Best Fit.

Accolades

Track listing
All credits taken from Qobuz and the album liner notes.

Notes
  signifies an additional producer.
  signifies an original producer.
 "Gibberish (Interlude)" features un-credited vocals from Ryan Ashley.
"Correct" features un-credited vocals from Ryan Ashley, Tre Jean-Marie and Kate Stewart.
 "Colour" samples lyrical content from the song "The Rainbow Song", originally written by Arthur Hamilton.
 "Body" partially samples the album's previous track "Colour", featuring Hailee Steinfeld.
 "Hearsay (Interlude)" features un-credited vocals from Barto.
 "Girlfriend" samples the song "Ai No Corrida", originally performed and written by Chaz Jankel.
 "Paradise" samples the song "Free", originally performed and written by Ultra Naté.

References

2018 debut albums
MNEK albums
Albums produced by MNEK
Albums produced by Tre Jean-Marie